Cirsium ochrocentrum is a species of thistle known by the common name yellowspine thistle. It is native to the Great Plains of the Central United States and to the desert regions of the western United States and northern Mexico. Its range extends from eastern Oregon east to the Black Hills of South Dakota, south as far as the Mexican State of Durango.

Description

The leaves are generally deeply lobed and the lobes cut into sharp teeth. The longest leaves at the base of the plant are up to about 25 centimeters (10 inches) long. The leaves are spiny, with spines up to 1.5 centimeters long.

The inflorescence consists of several flower heads, each lined with hard, toothed phyllaries tipped with spines. The head contains white, pink, or lavender disc florets but no ray florets.

The fruit is an achene with a brown body nearly a centimeter long topped with a pappus which may be 3 centimeters long.

Varieties
Cirsium ochrocentrum var. martinii (Barlow-Irick) D.J.Keil – Mexico, Arizona, New Mexico
Cirsium ochrocentrum var. ochrocentrum – United States

Uses
Among the Zuni people, an infusion of the plant taken by both partners as a contraceptive. An infusion of whole plant is also taken as a diaphoretic, diuretic, and emetic to treat syphilis. An infusion of the fresh or dried root is taken three times a day for diabetes.

It is a weed in California and Northwestern Mexico. It grows in fields and disturbed areas such as roadsides.

References

External links
 
 
 
 
 

ochrocentrum
Flora of Northwestern Mexico
Flora of the Western United States
Plants described in 1841
Plants used in traditional Native American medicine
Flora without expected TNC conservation status